Saint Lucia has competed at every edition of the Pan American Games since the twelfth edition of the multi-sport event in 1995. Track and field athlete Dominic Johnson won the country's first Pan Am medal in 2003, a bronze in the men's pole vault. To date, all three of Saint Lucia's medals have been won in the sport of track and field. As of the last Pan American Games in 2015, Saint Lucia is twenty-ninth on the all time medals list. Saint Lucia did not compete at the first and only Pan American Winter Games in 1990.

Medal count

References

 
Pan American Games